Barton Appler Bean was an American ichthyologist, born May 21, 1860 in Lancaster County, Pennsylvania and died June 16, 1947 in Chemung, New York, after falling from a bridge.

He was the brother of the ichthyologist Tarleton Hoffman Bean (1846-1916). He obtained a job at the National Museum of Natural History in Washington in 1881 where he worked for his brother. Barton became assistant in 1886 and assistant curator of the Division of Fishes in 1890. He retained this position until his retirement in 1932. Barton Bean also worked for the United States Fish Commission as an investigator.

See also
:Category:Taxa named by Barton Appler Bean

References

External links

 

American ichthyologists
1860 births
1947 deaths